Chiconamel is a village (pueblo) in the Mexican state of Veracruz. It is located in the state's Huasteca Alta region. It serves as the municipal seat for the surrounding municipality of Chiconamel. 

In the 2005 INEGI Census, the village of Chiconamel  reported a total population of 1,517.

References

Populated places in Veracruz